White cell can refer to:

White blood cell
White cell (spectroscopy), a type of multiple reflection gas phase spectroscopy cell